Geoff Lindsey is a British linguist, writer and director who has written episodes for television series including the BBC soap opera EastEnders and The Bill.

Lindsey trained in directing at the Bournemouth Film School, where he wrote and directed the short film The Band Parts starring Graham Fellows.  In 1999 he was selected for the Carlton Screenwriters course.  This led to his writing the anthology tribute Inspector Morse: Rest In Peace, and to his first television episode commissions.  As a lead writer on the soap opera Family Affairs, he wrote the UK's first ever interactive soap episodes.

Lindsey directed Michael Palin in the short How to Use Your Coconuts for the DVD of Monty Python and the Holy Grail.  With BreakThru Films, he wrote and directed the short film The Clap starring Steve Furst which was a finalist in Turner Classic Movies Classic Shorts 2005.

For BreakThru Films' Magic Piano, Lindsey wrote the screenplay, and selected and arranged the musical score performed by Lang Lang.  He also directed Lang Lang and Heather Graham in the live action segments of the feature-length The Flying Machine.

Lindsey is also a pronunciation coach and gives workshops on contemporary English pronunciation, at University College London (UCL) and internationally.  He was interviewed on intonation as the studio guest of Stephen Fry on the BBC radio series Fry's English Delight.  He has argued that the phonetic transcription systems for Received Pronunciation that are used in many dictionaries are outdated, as the upper-class accent of the 20th century has died out.  He has proposed a replacement transcription system for a more modern form of British English.

Lindsey previously worked as a lecturer in phonetics at University College London. He has a BA in Linguistics from UCL and an MA and PhD from University of California Los Angeles.

References

External links
Lindsey's writer-director website

British television writers
British film directors
Living people
British soap opera writers
Alumni of Arts University Bournemouth
Year of birth missing (living people)